Pamphaginae is a subfamily of grasshoppers in the family Pamphagidae, with species found in Africa, Europe and Asia.

Tribes and Genera 
The following genera are recognised in the subfamily Pamphaginae:

Euryparyphini
Auth: La Greca, 1993
 Eunapiodes Bolívar, 1907
 Euryparyphes Fischer, 1853
 Nadigeumigus La Greca, 1993
 Paraeumigus Bolívar, 1914
 Paraeuryparyphes La Greca, 1993

Finotiini
Auth: Bolívar, 1916 (monotypic)
 Finotia Bonnet, 1884

Nocarodeini
Auth: Bolívar, 1916

 Araxiana Mistshenko, 1951
 Bufonocarodes Mistshenko, 1951
 Ebnerodes Ramme, 1951
 Eunothrotes Adelung, 1907
 Iranacris Mistshenko, 1951
 Neoparanothrotes Mirzayans, 1991
 Nocaracris Uvarov, 1928
 Nocarodes Fischer von Waldheim, 1846
 Paranocarodes Bolívar, 1916
 Paranothrotes Mistshenko, 1951
 Pseudonothrotes Mistshenko, 1951
 Turkanocaracris Ünal, 2016

Pamphagini
Auth: Burmeister, 1840

 Acaeropa Uvarov, 1927
 Acinipe Rambur, 1838
 Amigus Bolívar, 1914
 Eumigus Bolívar, 1878
 Glauia Bolívar, 1912
 Glauvarovia Morales-Agacino, 1945
 Kurtharzia Koçak, 1981
 Ocneridia Bolívar, 1912
 Ocnerodes Brunner von Wattenwyl, 1882
 Ocneropsis Uvarov, 1942
 Ocnerosthenus Massa, 1995
 Orchamus Stål, 1876
 Pamphagus Thunberg, 1815
 Paracinipe Descamps & Mounassif, 1972
 Prionosthenus Bolívar, 1878
 Pseudamigus Chopard, 1943
 Pseudoglauia Morales-Agacino & Descamps, 1968

Tropidauchenini
Auth: Zhang, Yin & Yin, 2003
 Saxetania Mistshenko, 1951
 Tropidauchen Saussure, 1887

Incertae sedis
 Acrostira Enderlein, 1929
 Purpuraria Enderlein, 1929

References

External links

Pamphagidae